Dučina  is a village in the municipality of Sopot, Serbia. According to the 2002 census, the village has a population of 736 people.

References

Suburbs of Belgrade
Sopot, Belgrade